Eric Morecambe (John Eric Bartholomew, 14 May 1926 – 28 May 1984) and Ernie Wise (Ernest Wiseman, 27 November 1925 – 21 March 1999), known as Morecambe and Wise (and sometimes as Eric and Ernie), were an English comic double act, working in variety, radio, film and most successfully in television. Their partnership lasted from 1941 until Morecambe's death in 1984. They have been described as "the most illustrious, and the best-loved, double-act that Britain has ever produced".

In a list of the 100 Greatest British Television Programmes drawn up by the British Film Institute in 2000, voted for by industry professionals, The Morecambe and Wise Show was placed 14th. In September 2006, they were voted by the general public as number 2 in a poll of TV's 50 Greatest Stars. Their early career was the subject of the 2011 television biopic Eric and Ernie, and their 1970s career was the subject of the television biopic Eric, Ernie and Me in 2017.

In 1976, Morecambe and Wise were both awarded the OBE. In 1999, they were posthumously awarded the BAFTA Fellowship. In 2013, they were honoured with a blue plaque at Teddington Studios, where their last four series of The Morecambe and Wise Show were recorded.

History
Morecambe and Wise's friendship began in 1940 when they were each booked separately to appear in Jack Hylton's revue Youth Takes a Bow at the Nottingham Empire Theatre. At the suggestion of Eric's mother, Sadie, they worked on a double act. They made their double act debut in August 1941 at the Liverpool Empire. War service broke up the act but they reunited by chance at the Swansea Empire Theatre in 1946 when they joined forces again. They made their name in variety, appearing in a variety circus, the Windmill Theatre, the Glasgow Empire and many venues around Britain. After this they made their name in radio, first in Variety Fanfare (Ronnie Taylor, Hulme Hippodrome) made by the BBC in Manchester, and then their own radio show, You're Only Young Once. With national fame they transferred to television in 1954. Their debut TV show, Running Wild, was not well received and led to a damning newspaper review: "Definition of the week: TV set — the box in which they buried Morecambe and Wise." Eric apparently carried a copy of this review around with him ever afterward, and from then on the duo kept a tight control over their material. In 1956 they were offered a spot in the Winifred Atwell show with material written by Johnny Speight and this was a success. In 1959 they topped the bill in BBC TV's long-running variety show The Good Old Days in a Boxing Day edition of the programme. In later years the pair would become a Christmas TV institution in their own right.

They had a series of shows that spanned over twenty years, during which time they developed and honed their act, most notably after moving to the BBC in 1968, where they were to be teamed with their long-term writer Eddie Braben.  It is this period of their careers that is widely regarded as their "glory days". Their shows were:
 Running Wild (BBC, 1954) (Various writers)
 Two of a Kind (ATV, 1961–68) (Writers: Hills and Green)
 The Morecambe & Wise Show (BBC, 1968–77) (Writers: Hills and Green (1968), Eddie Braben (1969–77))
 The Morecambe & Wise Show (Thames Television, 1978–83) (writers: Barry Cryer and John Junkin (1978), Eddie Braben (1980–83))
 The Eric Morecambe and Ernie Wise Show (BBC Radio 2, 1975–78. Writer: Eddie Braben)

The pair starred in three feature films during the 1960s — The Intelligence Men (1965), That Riviera Touch (1966), and The Magnificent Two (1967). In 1983 they made their last film, Night Train To Murder. They were also guests on many television variety series; however, it was in a US series that they appeared as guests most frequently, featuring twelve times on The Ed Sullivan Show between 1963 and 1968 - more than any other British entertainers. The duo were featured in a comic book in 1977.

Style and performance
Morecambe and Wise started as a song-and-dance comedic team, with Morecambe playing the more bumbling comic role and Wise the affable straight man, but over time (and with new writers) the nature of the act changed. By the 1960s, the characters were more complex, with both Morecambe and Wise playing comedic characters who could set up each other for laughs, as well as garner big laughs with their many catchphrases, character bits and reactions.  In essence, the straight man/wacky comic dynamic shifted, so that both men were equally capable of fulfilling either role.  In the later and most successful part of their career, which spanned the 1970s, Morecambe and Wise were joined behind the scenes by Eddie Braben, a script writer who generated almost all their material (Morecambe and Wise were also sometimes credited as supplying "additional material") and defined what is now thought of as typical Morecambe and Wise humour. Together Morecambe, Wise and Braben were known as "The Golden Triangle", becoming one of the UK's all-time favourite comedy acts.

John Ammonds was also central to the duo's most successful period in the 1970s. As the producer of the BBC TV shows, it was his idea to involve celebrity guests. He also perfected the duo's familiar dance, which was based on a dance performed by Groucho Marx in the film Horse Feathers.

Ernest Maxin started choreographing the musical numbers in 1970, and succeeded John Ammonds as producer of the BBC TV shows in 1974. Maxin, who won a BAFTA for the Best Light Entertainment Show for the Morecambe and Wise 1977 Christmas Show, was also responsible for devising and choreographing many of their great musical comedy routines including "The Breakfast Sketch", "Singin' in the Rain", and the homage to South Pacific, "There is Nothing Like a Dame" featuring BBC newsreaders in an acrobatic dance routine.

Catchphrases and visual gags
Much of the material of the Morecambe and Wise shows consisted of their well-worn catch phrases that recurred like motifs throughout their career. Barely a show would go by without Eric referring to Ernie's "short, fat, hairy legs", or pointing out that "you can't see the join", where Ernie's supposed wig was attached. The wig sometimes appeared in the credits, with variations on "Mr Wise appears by kind permission of Rentawig". Eric never seemed to tire of offering his partner some "Tea, Ern?". This was a pun on "tea urn", a vessel for serving hot drinks used in workplaces. If anyone fluffed their line, Eric would usually say, "That's easy for you to say!"  or "You can say that again". When Ernie disagreed with him, Eric would say, "Just watch it, that's all!"; often said by Eric when grabbing Ernie by the lapels. If someone said a line whilst he was looking at somebody else, Eric would say, "You said that without moving your lips"; as if the non-speaker were a ventriloquist throwing his or her voice. Another ventriloquial allusion (probably quoting Arthur Worsley) was made when Eric said, should his intended listener be looking away, "Look at me when I'm talking to you!".

Some catch phrases developed from earlier sketches. When Eric played an incompetent 'Mr Memory', unable to remember anything without unsubtle prompting from Ernie, Ernie prompted Eric with "Arsenal!" disguised very badly as a cough. Later, whenever Ernie, or anyone else, coughed or sneezed, Eric would shout "Arsenal!".

The catchphrase "Hello folks, and what about the workers?" was developed by Eric from a similar saying by Harry Secombe in The Goon Show. For Secombe this was a simple greeting, while for Eric it expressed his great sexual interest in some pretty girl or female guest. It was often accompanied by him slapping the back of his own neck to recover his concentration.

Their treatment of their guest stars was terrible for effect. Eric and sometimes Ernie would often call an invited guest by the wrong name. So André Previn was "Andrew Preview", Ian Carmichael was Hoagy Carmichael, Elton John was Elephant John, Vanessa Redgrave was "Vanilla Redgrave" and when The Beatles appeared, Ringo Starr was "Bongo". Alternatively, one or both would seem not to recognise the famous guest artist at all. The pair would frequently make fun of their old friend, the singer and entertainer Des O'Connor in various disparaging ways.  A rhyming example was: "If you want me to be a goner, get me an LP by Des O'Connor". Another typical example was "There's only one thing wrong with Des O'Connor records. The hole in the middle isn't big enough". O'Connor actually appeared in the 1975 Christmas special and eavesdropped on these insults before Eric and Ernie noticed him. In reality some of these put-downs were suggested by Des himself.

Many of their catch phrases entered the language. Particularly when they were at their peak, people could be heard using them for humorous effect. The question: "What do you think of it so far?", said by Eric, who would use a prop—such as a statue or stuffed toy—to answer: "Rubbish!", was frequently heard. Morecambe said later that whenever Luton Town were playing away and he happened to be in the director's box, if Luton were behind at half-time the home fans would shout, "What do you think of it so far?". Other examples were: "There's no answer to that!", which was said by Eric after anything which could be construed as innuendo. He would also say "Pardon?" for a similar effect.

Schoolboys could be seen holding an open hand underneath a friend's chin while saying, "Get out of that!". When Eric did this to Ernie, it was meant to be a karate move that incapacitated the victim. It was often followed by "You can't, can you?". Also common was, "They can't touch you for it" (i.e., it is not illegal); a comment following a slightly obscure word, turning it into a double entendre. In addition, Eric would say "Be honest" directly to the audience if they had carried out what he thought was a particularly successful routine. If Ernie received a little applause for something, Eric would say "I see your fan's in", and whenever the doorbell rang in their shared flat, Eric would say to Ernie, "How do you do that?"

Another long-running - usually incomplete - gag was when Eric begins a story, ‘There were two old men sitting in deckchairs. One turns to the other and says, “It’s nice out today”’. Ernie usually closed down the gag at that point as it was obviously heading for a rude punchline. Occasionally, however, he would close it with "Well, put it away, there's a Policeman coming!" In a Christmas special when the duo were being interviewed by Sir David Frost, Eric concluded the story with "You're right, I think I'll get mine out".

During the shows in which Ernie's execrable plays were shown, a catch phrase for Ernie was developed. This was, "The play what I wrote", which also was used commonly elsewhere. Guest stars were conned into taking part in these plays and made to utter such grammatical monstrosities as when Glenda Jackson (at the time a noted Shakespearean actress) had to say, "All men are fools and what makes them so is having beauty, like what I have got", to the obvious smug satisfaction of the words' supposed author.

Several visual gags were often repeated; several visual gags were often repeated.

Very frequently used, and copied by the public, was Eric slapping the shoulders and then both sides of Ernie's face. A particular affectation of Eric was him putting his glasses askew or waggling them up and down on his nose. As with André Previn, if they appeared uncooperative, Eric would grab a guest by the lapels and pull them to his face in a threatening manner. He would also grimace like Humphrey Bogart (or so he thought) if Ernie or a guest was particularly challenging.

Eric would often hold an empty paper bag in one hand, throw an imaginary coin, or other small object, into the air, watch it during its flight and then flick the bag with his finger giving the impression that the item had landed in the bag. Again, he would hold a paper cup in his mouth and over his nose to perform a brief impersonation of Jimmy Durante, singing, 'Sitting at my pianna the udder day...'

Ernie would appear on a curtained stage expecting Eric to join him from behind the curtain, but Eric would be unable to find the opening and have to fight his way on. This gag could be reversed with Eric trying to fight his way off, often asking Ernie if he had a key to unlock the curtain. Another curtain gag would have Eric standing in front of the stage curtains or at the side of the stage and pretending that an arm (his own) comes out from behind the curtain and seizes him by the throat. If Eric had his back to a guest, he would jerk his body as if the guest had goosed him.

Often, Eric would suddenly notice the camera and put on a fixed, cheesy grin. Ernie would frequently notice him doing this, stand behind Eric and grin a similar grin into the camera, over Eric's shoulder. Eric and Ernie would introduce the special guest facing stage-left with their arms out. However, the guest would enter from stage-right. Also, at the end of several shows, the duo would exit the stage by skipping while putting alternate hands behind their heads and backs.

Television series
Typical Morecambe and Wise programmes were effectively sketch shows crossed with a sitcom. The duo would usually open the show as themselves on a mock stage in front of curtains emblazoned with an M and W logo. Morecambe and Wise's comic style varied subtly throughout their career, depending on their writers. Their writers during most of the 1960s, Dick Hills and Sid Green, took a relatively straightforward approach, depicting Eric as an aggressive, knockabout comedian and Ernie as an essentially conventional and somewhat disapproving straight man. When Eddie Braben took over as writer, he made the relationship considerably deeper and more complex. The critic Kenneth Tynan noted that, with Braben as writer, Morecambe and Wise had a unique dynamic—Ernie was a comedian who wasn't funny, while Eric was a straight man who was funny. The Ernie persona became simultaneously more egotistical and more naïve. Morecambe pointed out that Braben wrote him as "tougher, less gormless, harder towards Ern." Wise's contribution to the humour is a subject of an ongoing debate. To the end of his life he would always reject interviewers' suggestions that he was the straight man, preferring to call himself the song-and-dance man. However, Wise's skill and dedication was essential to their joint success, and Tynan praised Wise's performance as "unselfish, ebullient and indispensable".

A central concept was that the duo lived together as close, long-term friends (there were many references to a childhood friendship) who shared not merely a flat but also a bed—although their relationship was purely platonic and merely continued a tradition of comic partners sleeping in the same bed that had begun with Laurel and Hardy. Morecambe was initially uncomfortable with the bed-sharing sketches, but changed his mind upon being reminded of the Laurel and Hardy precedent; however, he still insisted on smoking his pipe in the bed scenes "for the masculinity". The front room of the flat and also the bedroom were used frequently throughout the show episodes, although Braben would also transplant the duo into various external situations, such as a health food shop or a bank. Many references were made to Ernie's supposed meanness with money and drink (for example Eric telling Shirley Bassey of Ernie's dislike of her hit "Big Spender"). 

Another concept of the shows during the Braben era was Ernie's utterly confident presentation of amateurishly inept plays "wot I wrote". This allowed for another kind of sketch: the staged historical drama, which usually parodied genuine historical television plays or films (such as Stalag 17, Antony and Cleopatra, or Napoleon and Josephine). Wise's character would write a play, complete with cheap props, shaky scenery and appallingly clumsy writing ("the play what I wrote" became a catchphrase), which would then be acted out by Morecambe, Wise and the show's guest star. Guests who participated included many big names of the 1970s and 1980s, such as Dame Flora Robson, Penelope Keith, Laurence Olivier, Sir John Mills, Vanessa Redgrave, Eric Porter, Peter Cushing (who in a running gag would keep turning up to complain that he had not been paid for an earlier appearance) and Frank Finlay—as well as Glenda Jackson (as Cleopatra: "All men are fools. And what makes them so is having beauty like what I have got..."). Jackson had not previously been known as a comedian and this appearance led to her Oscar-winning role in A Touch of Class. Morecambe and Wise would often pretend not to have heard of their guest, or would appear to confuse them with someone else (former UK Prime Minister Harold Wilson returned the favour, when appearing as a guest at the duo's flat, by referring to Morecambe as "Mor-e-cam-by"). Also noteworthy was the occasion when the respected BBC newsreader Angela Rippon was induced to show her legs in a dance number (she had trained as a ballet dancer before she became a journalist and TV presenter). Braben later said that a large amount of the duo's humour was based on irreverence. A running gag in a number of shows was a short sequence showing a well-known artist in close-up saying "I appeared in an Ernie Wise play, and look what happened to me!". The camera would then pull back and show the artist doing some low-status job such as newspaper seller (Ian Carmichael), Underground guard (Fenella Fielding), dustman (Eric Porter), bus conductor (André Previn), or some other ill-paid employment. However, celebrities felt they had received the highest accolade in showbusiness by being invited to appear in "an Ernest Wide play" as Ernie once mispronounced it during a show's introduction involving "Vanilla" (Vanessa) Redgrave.

As a carry-over from their music hall days, Eric and Ernie sang and danced at the end of each show, although they were forced to abandon this practice when Morecambe's heart condition prevented him from dancing. The solution was that Eric would walk across the stage with coat and bag, ostensibly to wait for his bus, while Ernie danced by himself. Their peculiar skipping dance, devised by their BBC producer John Ammonds, was a modified form of a dance used by Groucho Marx. Their signature tune was Bring Me Sunshine. They either sang this at the end of each show or it was used as a theme tune during the credits (although in their BBC shows they used other songs as well, notably "Following You Around", "Positive Thinking" "Don't You Agree" and "Just Around the Corner"). A standard gag at the end of each show was for Janet Webb to appear behind the pair, walk to the front of the stage and push them out of her way. She would then recite:

Webb was never announced, and seldom appeared in their shows in any other role. According to a BBC documentary, this was a parody of George Formby's wife who used to come on stage to take the bows with him at the end of a show.

Another running gag involved an old colleague from their music hall days, harmonica player Arthur Tolcher. Arthur would keep appearing on the stage in evening wear and would play the opening bars of "España cañí" on his harmonica, only to be told "Not now, Arthur!" At the very end of the show, following the final credit, Arthur would sneak on stage and begin to play, only for the screen to cut to black.

In June 2007, the BBC released a DVD of surviving material from their first series in 1968, and the complete second series from 1969. In November 2011, Network DVD released the complete, uncut 13 episodes of the second ATV series of Two of a Kind from 1962. It was advertised as the first series due to the fact the original first series is completely missing from television archives.

In 2020, a black and white copy of an episode from October 1970, believed lost, was found in the attic of Morecambe's widow. It was restored for re-broadcast at Christmas 2021.

Christmas specials
With the exception of 1974, the show had end-of-year Christmas specials, which became some of the highest-rated TV programmes of the era. Braben has said that people judged the quality of their Christmas experience on the quality of the Morecambe and Wise Christmas Special. From 1969 until 1980, except 1974, the shows were always broadcast on Christmas Day. Due to Eric Morecambe's heart attack, Christmas Day 1974 featured a highlights package of clips from previous shows rather than a new programme, introduced by Michael Parkinson, including a newly recorded interview with Morecambe & Wise.

The Morecambe and Wise Christmas Show on BBC in 1977 scored one of the highest ever audiences in British television history with more than 20 million viewers (the cited figure varies between 21 and 28 million, depending on the source). The duo remain among the most consistently high-rating performers of all time on British television, regularly topping the in-week charts during their heyday in the 1970s and early 1980s.

Famous sketches
Grieg's Piano Concerto
Classic sketches from such shows often revolved around the guest stars. One example is the 1971 appearance of André Previn, who was introduced onstage by Ernie as Andrew Preview. Previn's schedule was extremely tight, and Morecambe and Wise were worried that he had very little time to rehearse: popular myth holds that Previn had to learn his lines in the taxi on the way from the airport, but in reality he had taken part in two days of rehearsals (out of a planned five) before having to fly to America to see his mother, who had been taken ill. The final result was described by their biographer as "probably their finest moment".

The sketch was a rework of one which appeared in Two of a Kind (Series 3, Episode 7) and written by Green and Hills.

Previn is initially enthusiastic as a guest, but he is perplexed by the news that he will not, after all, be conducting Yehudi Menuhin in Mendelssohn's Violin Concerto, but Edvard Grieg's A minor Piano Concerto with Eric as piano soloist: 

At this point in the sketch Morecambe punches the air with his fist and ad-libs the line "Pow! He's in! I like him! I like him!". The television executive Michael Grade has observed that it was Previn's expert delivery of his lines that caused Morecambe to visibly relax: "Eric's face lights up as if to say, 'Oh, yes! This is going to be great!" Since Previn hadn't time to rehearse, his comic timing was a surprise to Morecambe, who had explained to Previn simply that "None of the three of us should believe that this is funny."

Eric goes on to treat Previn and the orchestra with his customary disdain ("In the Second Movement, not too heavy on the banjos") and produces his own score ("autographed copies available afterwards, boys") but consistently fails to enter on the conductor's cue. This is because, when the orchestra begins, Eric is standing right next to Previn. During the introductory bars, Eric has to descend from the conductor's rostrum, down to his place at the piano. This he cannot do in the time available—or rather, deliberately meanders so as to miss his cue. After failing twice to reach the piano, they decide he should be seated there at the start. Even then, he cannot see Previn when the conductor gestures for him to begin playing, because the piano lid obscures his view. Previn has to leap in the air at the appropriate time, so that Eric can see him. When he finally manages to enter on time, Eric's rendition of the piano part is so bizarre that Previn becomes exasperated and tells Eric that he is playing "all the wrong notes". Eric stands up, seizes Previn by the lapels and menacingly informs him "I'm playing all the right notes—but not necessarily in the right order." Previn demonstrates how the piece should be played but Eric, after a moment's reflection, delivers a verdict of "Rubbish!" and he and Ernie walk off in disgust. Previn starts playing Eric's version and the duo rush back, declare that Previn has finally "got it" and start dancing ecstatically. The sketch's impact can be assessed by the fact that twenty-five years later, London taxi drivers were still addressing André Previn as "Mr. Preview".

Singin' in the Rain
One of the famous Morecambe and Wise routines was their 1976 Christmas Show parody of the scene from the film Singin' in the Rain in which Gene Kelly dances in the rain and sings the song "Singin' in the Rain". This recreation featured Ernie exactly copying Gene Kelly's dance routine, on a set which exactly copied the set used in the movie, and Eric performed the role of the policeman. The difference from the original was that in the Morecambe and Wise version, there is no water, except for some downpours onto Eric's head (through a drain, or dumped out of a window, etc.). This lack of water was initially because of practical considerations (the floor of the studio had many electrical cables on it, and such quantities of water would be dangerous)—but Morecambe and Wise found a way to turn the lack of water into a comic asset. The sketch was devised and choreographed by Ernest Maxin.

The Breakfast Sketch
This 1976 sketch has become one of the duo's most familiar, and is a parody of a stripper routine where Eric and Ernie are seen listening to the radio at breakfast time. This sketch was not an original but was adapted from an earlier one Benny Hill performed on his own show during the mid-1960s. David Rose's tune "The Stripper" comes on and the duo perform a dance using various kitchen utensils and food items, including Ernie catching slices of toast as they popped out of the toaster, and finally opening the fridge door to be bathed in light, as if on stage, while they pull out strings of sausages which they whirl around to the music. The sketch was choreographed and produced by Ernest Maxin.

In December 2007, viewers of satellite channel Gold voted the sketch the best moment of Morecambe and Wise's shows.

Propellerheads parodied the sketch in the video for their 1998 single "Crash!" and it was parodied in two UK television commercials in 2008, for PG Tips and Aunt Bessie's Yorkshire Puddings.

Tribute album
Eric and Ernie often cited the earlier comedy team Flanagan and Allen as influences on their own work; although Morecambe and Wise never imitated or copied Flanagan and Allen, they did sometimes work explicit references to the earlier team into their own cross-talk routines and sketches. In 1971 they recorded a tribute album, Morecambe and Wise Sing Flanagan and Allen (Phillips 6382 095), in which they performed some of the earlier team's more popular songs in their own style, without attempting to imitate the originals.

Films
 The Intelligence Men
 That Riviera Touch
 The Magnificent Two
 Night Train to Murder

Notes

References

External links
 
 
 Morecambe & Wise Eric And Ern - Keeping the Magic Alive (books, film, TV reviews, interviews)
 Morecambe & Wise biography, plus complete list of radio/television/film/book/record appearances at Laughterlog.com
 Morecambe & Wise in advert for Texaco with racing driver James Hunt, at YouTube
 Morecambe & Wise in advert for the Atari 2600 computer games console, at YouTube
 Morecambe & Wise Eric and Ernie letter unearthed, at BBC News 12 October 2009

 
English comedy duos
English male comedians
1941 establishments in England